Lower Broomhedge is a hamlet in County Antrim, Northern Ireland, near Lisburn. In the 2001 Census it had a population of 180 people. It lies within the Lisburn City Council area. It is usually considered part of Broomhedge itself rather than a separate village.

References 
NI Neighbourhood Information System

Villages in County Antrim